Sanja Jovanović (born 15 September 1986 in Dubrovnik) is a female backstroke swimmer from Croatia, who made her Olympic debut for her native country at the 2004 Summer Olympics in Athens, Greece. There she competed in the 100 m and 200 m backstroke, where she finished in 17th and 13th position. On 13 April 2008 she broke the world record in 50 meters backstroke on European Short Course Swimming Championships, improving her record set on 15 December 2007. She has a twin sister and two other sisters, and lives in suburb of Dubrovnik called Mokošica.

Olympic results

At the 2013 Mediterranean Games held in Mersin, Turkey she won the gold medal in 50 meters backstroke (28:48)

World records

See also
 World record progression 50 metres backstroke

References

External links
 
 
 

1986 births
Living people
Croatian female backstroke swimmers
Croatian female butterfly swimmers
Croatian female swimmers
Olympic swimmers of Croatia
Swimmers at the 2004 Summer Olympics
Swimmers at the 2008 Summer Olympics
Sportspeople from Dubrovnik
World record setters in swimming
Swimmers at the 2012 Summer Olympics
Medalists at the FINA World Swimming Championships (25 m)
European Aquatics Championships medalists in swimming
Mediterranean Games gold medalists for Croatia
Mediterranean Games silver medalists for Croatia
Mediterranean Games bronze medalists for Croatia
Swimmers at the 2001 Mediterranean Games
Swimmers at the 2005 Mediterranean Games
Swimmers at the 2009 Mediterranean Games
Swimmers at the 2013 Mediterranean Games
Mediterranean Games medalists in swimming
21st-century Croatian women